Egattur may refer to the following neighborhoods of Chennai, India:

 Egattur (Tiruvallur District), a village in Tiruvallur District, Chennai Metropolitan Area
 Egattur (Kanchipuram District), a village in Kachipuram District, Chennai Metropolitan Area